SS Walter W. Schwenk was a Liberty ship built in the United States during World War II. She was named after Walter W. Schwenk, a World War I Navy veteran. Before World War II Schwenk worked with Blake Line, Consolidated Navigation Corporation, and Southgate–Nelson Corporation. In 1940, he joined the US Maritime Commission (MARCOM), and later the War Shipping Administration (WSA), February 1942. On 15 April 1944, he was appointed the Atlantic Coast director of the WSA, responsible for all cargo and ship movement on the East Coast.

Construction
Walter W. Schwenk was laid down on 9 June 1945, under a Maritime Commission (MARCOM) contract, MC hull 3144, by J.A. Jones Construction, Panama City, Florida; she was launched on 21 July 1945.

History
She was allocated to United States Lines Co., 22 August 1945. On 24 August 1946, she was placed in the Suisun Bay Reserve Fleet, Suisun Bay, California. On 10 August 1949, she was laid up in the National Defense Reserve Fleet, Mobile, Alabama. She was sold for scrapping, 22 February 1972, to Pinto Island Metals Co., for $36,500. She was withdrawn from the fleet, 3 March 1972.

References

Bibliography

 
 
 
 
 

 

Liberty ships
Ships built in Panama City, Florida
1945 ships
Suisun Bay Reserve Fleet
Mobile Reserve Fleet